Natalie Krill (born February 4, 1983) is a Canadian actress and former dancer. She appeared in the hockey drama MVP and in the independent film Below Her Mouth.

Early life 
Natalie Krill was born and raised in Saskatchewan. She enjoyed the arts at an early age, encouraged by her mother. Krill signed herself up for dance lessons at age 6, and studied ballet, tap and jazz dance until she was 18 years old, at which point she moved to Toronto to pursue an acting career.

Career 
Krill has appeared as Lorraine Fleming in the Moscow production of the musical 42nd Street; the play based on the film Dirty Dancing when it made its North American premiere in Toronto in the fall of 2008; and the film Hollywoodland. She has been seen in the role of Alex Kendrick in The Listener and in the role of Phoebe on the Canadian family channel show The Next Step.  In 2016, she co-starred in April Mullen's independent film Below Her Mouth, which was an official selection at the Toronto International Film Festival, despite lukewarm reception from film critics.

Personal life 
Following her role in the erotic lesbian drama Below Her Mouth, Krill anticipated questions about her sexuality, and she told a journalist, "Personally, I’m open. Like I don’t feel the need to label myself and I believe love is love." She and her husband Daniel Kannimae have a son, born in 2020.

Filmography

References

External links

 Natalie Krill's Official website
 

1983 births
Living people
21st-century Canadian actresses
Actresses from Saskatchewan
Canadian cheerleaders
Canadian female dancers
Canadian film actresses
Canadian stage actresses
Canadian television actresses
Place of birth missing (living people)